Aleksandr Kulinitš (born 24 May 1992) is an Estonian footballer who plays as a defender for Estonian club Narva Trans.

Career
Kulinits started his senior career with FCI Levadia Tallinn. In 2018, he signed for NK Krško in the Slovenian PrvaLiga, where he made thirty-five appearances and scored three goals.

In January 2019 he returned to Estonia and joined Nõmme Kalju.

References

External links
 
 Aleksandr Kulinitš Infonetis
 Interview by Alexander Kulinits
 Alexander Kulinich: “There are all conditions for training”
 Betting fraudster Kulinich will be on the football field again in the summer

1992 births
Living people
Estonian footballers
Footballers from Tallinn
Association football defenders
Tallinna JK players
FCI Levadia Tallinn players
FCI Levadia U21 players
FCI Tallinn players
NK Krško players
Nõmme Kalju FC players
Meistriliiga players
Esiliiga players
Slovenian PrvaLiga players
Estonia youth international footballers
Estonia under-21 international footballers
Estonian expatriate footballers
Expatriate footballers in Slovenia
Estonian expatriate sportspeople in Slovenia